Waldo Penner (1919 - 2006) was a Baptist missionary who served in India from 1946 through 1981 as a team member of the Canadian Baptist Ministries.  Penner was born in Secunderabad in India where his parents were missionaries of the American Baptist Mission.

Studies
For collegiate studies, Penner studied at the McMaster University, Hamilton for the graduate degrees of B.A. and B.D..  Penner also studied for a postgraduate course leading to M.Th. at the Berkeley Baptist Divinity School (renamed as the American Baptist Seminary of the West), Berkeley.

Ecclesiastical ministry
After Penner's ordination in 1945, he volunteered for missionary service in India and stayed on in the country for more than 35 years.

Ecumenical initiatives
In 1958 when A. B. Masilamani stepped down as Principal of the Baptist Theological Seminary, Kakinada, the Seminary Council appointed Waldo Penner to take on the Principalship of the Seminary.  It was during this period that ecumenical conversations were building up for the formation of a unified Seminary in the state of Andhra Pradesh (Telangana included).  Penner, together with his companion, A. B. Masilamani were in the forefront of the ecumenical conversations leading to the formation of the Andhra Christian Theological College, Rajahmundry in 1964 together with the Anglicans, Congregationalists, Lutherans, the Methodists and the Wesleyans.

On the formation of the ecumenical seminary in 1964 in Rajahmundry, Penner relocated from Kakinada to Rajahmundry and joined the faculty of the newly formed ecumenical seminary and taught Systematic theology till 1971-1972 when the college shifted in its entirety to Hyderabad in Telangana.  Meanwhile, the Seminary Council appointed Victor Hahn in place of Waldo Penner at the Baptist Theological Seminary, Kakinada.  As for his companion, A. B. Masilamani, he had already moved to the Bible Society of India Andhra Pradesh Auxiliary, and like Penner was ministering in an ecumenical setting.

Development initiatives
When the 1977 Andhra Pradesh cyclone struck the coast of Krishna district along the Bay of Bengal, thousands of lives were lost.  As part of the relief and rebuilding efforts, the Canadian Baptist Ministries also lent its hand and its work was supervised by Waldo Penner.

Honours
In 1982, the McMaster University, Hamilton conferred upon Penner the degree of Doctor of Divinity by honoris causa.

References

20th-century Canadian Baptist ministers
Baptist writers
1919 births
2006 deaths
McMaster University alumni
Telugu people
Christian clergy from Andhra Pradesh
Indian Christian theologians
Indian Baptists
Canadian Baptist Ministries missionaries in India
Academic staff of the Senate of Serampore College (University)
Convention of Baptist Churches of Northern Circars pastors
Founders of academic institutions
Canadian Baptist Ministries